Carara  may refer to:

 Carara Kicks F.C.
 Carara National Park, Costa Rica

See also
 Carrara (disambiguation)
 Karara (disambiguation)